Sameer Zuberi MP (born in August 1979) is a Canadian politician who was elected to represent the federal riding of Pierrefonds—Dollard in the House of Commons of Canada in the 2019 Canadian federal election, sitting as a member of the Liberal Party.

Early life and education 

Born in Montreal, Zuberi is the eldest of six children raised in Laval, Quebec in a multicultural family, with a mother of Scottish and Italian descent and a father who moved to Canada from Pakistan in the 1970s. He attended the Marianopolis College at CEGEP and subsequently attended and graduated from Concordia University in 2004 where he obtained a BA in Mathematics. In 2010, he enrolled at the Université du Québec à Montréal in Baccalauréat en droit (LL.B.) program leading to his law degree in 2014. That same year, Zuberi became the first recipient of the Juanita Westmoreland-Traoré scholarship, in recognition of his social engagement. Named after the Commissioner for Canadian Human Rights Commission, the first Black Canadian judge in the history of Quebec and the first Black dean of a Canadian law school, Hon. Juanita Westmoreland-Traoré, the award is bestowed to law students for their outstanding contribution to the community by using their legal training to promote human rights, social justice and equality rights.

During his time at Concordia, Zuberi was twice elected as a vice-president at the Concordia Student Union and was a member of the Concordia Council on Student Life, advocating for students, supporting diversity, and encouraging a strong sense of community. Zuberi was also a board member of City of Montreal's Intercultural Council, served on the board of the West Island Assistance Fund and was one of the founding members of the Quebec Section of the Canadian Muslim Lawyers Association's (CMLA), its Vice-Chair in 2014 and national board member in 2015.

He is married and a father of two young girls.

Political career 

From 1997 to 2002, Zuberi served with The Black Watch, a Canadian Forces reserve unit, and assisted his compatriots during the 1998 Ice Storm. After graduating from Concordia University in 2004, he spent a year working as an English teacher in Kuwait. Upon his return to Canada in 2006, he joined the Ottawa office of the not-profit and non-partisan National Council of Canada Muslims (formerly known as the Canadian Council on American-Islamic Relations (CAN-CAIR)), Canada's leading Muslim advocacy organization, as the Media Relations and Human Rights Coordinator. After graduating from law school in 2014, Sameer was appointed as diversity and engagement officer at McGill University's Faculty of Medicine where he also was an elected member of the Senate. While at McGill, he worked to promote diversity and inclusion of Black and Indigenous students as well as students from lower socioeconomic backgrounds and those from rural Quebec.

In November 2013, Zuberi ran as a city councillor in the Bois-de-Liesse district of the Pierrefonds-Roxboro borough as a candidate for Projet Montréal. He ranked third, with 22.93% of the votes.

After Frank Baylis, Member of Parliament for Pierrefonds-Roxboro, announced that he would not run for a second term, Zuberi joined the nomination contest alongside five other Liberal Party candidates in one of the party's largest nominations with 9,000 registered votes and a turnout of 3,200. Zuberi won the official Liberal Party candidate and defeated the Conservative Party candidate to be elected as a member of the 43rd Canadian Parliament.

During the election campaign, it was alleged that Zuberi's past activities as a student and human rights activist were anti-Semitic. Zuberi denied these allegations on numerous occasions and was backed by the Liberal Party and leaders of the Jewish community in Montreal.

After the election, Zuberi was a member of several parliamentary committees, including the Committee on Justice and Human Rights, Committee on Scrutiny of Regulations and the Subcommittee on International Human Rights of the Standing Committee on Foreign Affairs and International Development, from which he stepped down after having traveled for personal reasons to the United States despite the travel restrictions between the United States and Canada due to the COVID-19 pandemic, which urged Canadians to avoid non-essential travel.

In June 2021, he officially became a member of the Standing Committee on Veterans Affairs, whose mandate is the management and operation of the Department of Veterans Affairs and other matters referred to it by the House of Commons. From December 2021, he was a member of the Public Safety and National Security Committee until June 2022. He is the Chair of the Subcommittee on International Human Rights of the Standing Committee on Foreign Affairs and International Development and Vice-Chair of Scrutiny of Regulations Committee.

As an elected MP, Zuberi presented a unanimous consent motion on the recognition of the Romani genocide. He has been Co-Chair of the bipartisan Canadian-Uyghur Parliamentary Friendship Group and one of the leading voices in Canada and within the Canadian Liberal Party regarding human rights abuses against the Uyghur community in China, which led to the adoption of a motion calling China's actions genocide, with no opposition to the motion. In partnership with Montreal's West Island Chamber of Commerce, Zuberi's office created a small business outreach program with the aim to help over one thousand local businesses in Pierrefonds—Dollard.  He now serves on the Joint Committee of the Scrutiny of Regulations.

Electoral record

References

External links

Living people
Liberal Party of Canada MPs
Members of the House of Commons of Canada from Quebec
Politicians from Montreal
21st-century Canadian politicians
People from Dollard-des-Ormeaux
1979 births
Canadian people of Pakistani descent
Canadian people of Italian descent
Canadian people of Scottish descent